During the 1999–2000 English football season, Bristol City F.C. competed in the Football League Second Division where they finished in 9th position. They also reached the final of the Football League Trophy losing 2–1 to Stoke City.

Season summary
Tony Pulis was appointed as manager for City's return to Division Two, but a mediocre first half of the season (including failing to win a single league game in October or November) saw the alarming possibility of a second successive relegation battle, rather than a promotion challenge. Just after the turn of the year, Pulis left to become manager of Portsmouth, and coach Tony Fawthrop took over for the remainder of the season, assisted by Leroy Rosenior. A much-improved second half of the season saw a respectable 9th place finish, and while Fawthrop initially accepted the manager's job on a permanent basis at the end of the season, he changed his mind and opted to focus on his business interests outside of football. Danny Wilson was therefore recruited as the manager to lead them into the next season.

Final league table

Results
Bristol City's score comes first

Legend

Football League Division Two

League Cup

FA Cup

Football League Trophy

Squad
Appearances for competitive matches only

References

Bristol City 1999–2000 at soccerbase.com

See also
1999–2000 in English football

Bristol City F.C. seasons
Bristol City